Belize Rural South is an electoral constituency in the Belize District represented in the House of Representatives of the National Assembly of Belize since 2020 by Andre Perez of the People's United Party (PUP).

Founding and creation 
The Rural South constituency was created for the 1961 general election as part of a major nationwide redistricting. Out of the 13 Belize District constituencies it is one of three located outside the Belize City limits. Belize Rural South consists of the offshore cayes (islands) of Belize District, including Ambergris Caye, Caye Caulker and St. George's Caye. San Pedro Town on Ambergris Caye is the constituency's main settlement.

Ever since the creation of Belize Rural Central in 1993, the name "Belize Rural South" has been something of a misnomer, as the constituency lies primarily to the north and east of the Belize District mainland. In 2012 it reported an electorate of 7,100, larger than any other Belize District constituency.

Area Representatives

Elections

References

British Honduras Legislative Assembly constituencies established in 1961
Political divisions in Belize
Belize Rural South
1961 establishments in British Honduras